Famciclovir is a guanosine analogue antiviral drug used for the treatment of various herpesvirus infections, most commonly for herpes zoster (shingles). It is a prodrug form of penciclovir with improved oral bioavailability. Famciclovir is marketed under the trade name Famvir (Novartis).

Famciclovir was patented in 1983 and approved for medical use in 1994. In 2007, the United States Food and Drug Administration approved the first generic version of famciclovir. Generic tablets are manufactured by TEVA Pharmaceuticals and Mylan Pharmaceuticals.

Medical uses
Famciclovir is indicated for the treatment of herpes zoster (shingles), treatment of herpes simplex virus 2 (genital herpes), herpes labialis (cold sores) in immunocompetent patients and for the suppression of recurring episodes of herpes simplex virus 2. It is also indicated for treatment of recurrent episodes of herpes simplex in HIV patients.

Adverse effects
Side effects: mild to extreme stomach upset, headaches, mild fever.

Herpes

Early treatment 
Several studies in humans and mice provide evidence that early treatment with famciclovir soon after the first infection with herpes can significantly lower the chance of future outbreaks. Use of famciclovir in this manner has been shown to reduce the amount of latent virus in the neural ganglia compared to no treatment or treatment with valaciclovir. A review of human subjects treated for five days with famciclovir 250 mg three times daily during their first herpes episode found that only 4.2 percent experienced a recurrence within six months after the first outbreak, a fivefold decrease compared to the 19 percent recurrence in acyclovir-treated patients. Neither drug affected latency if treatment was delayed for several months.

See also 
 Penciclovir
 Valaciclovir

References

External links 
 Famvir product website run by Novartis

Anti-herpes virus drugs
Prodrugs
Novartis brands
Schering-Plough brands
Purines
Acetate esters